Altino Marcondes (16 July 1898 – 25 May 1932), known as just Tatú, was a Brazilian footballer. He played in five matches for the Brazil national football team in 1922. He was also part of Brazil's squad for the 1922 South American Championship.

References

External links
 

1898 births
1932 deaths
Brazilian footballers
Brazil international footballers
Association footballers not categorized by position